Elachista ribentella is a moth of the family Elachistidae. It is found in Japan and the Russian Far East.

The forewing ground colour is mottled grey, with four indistinct mottled whitish markings. The hindwings are grey.

The larvae feed on Carex blepharicarpa. They mine the leaves of their host plant.

References

ribentella
Moths described in 2004
Moths of Japan
Moths of Asia